Hallikeri is a village in Dharwad district of Karnataka, India.

Demographics 
As of the 2011 Census of India there were 861 households in Hallikeri and a total population of 4,218 consisting of 2,132 males and 2,086 females. There were 538 children ages 0-6.

References

Villages in Dharwad district